Prabhu Bank Limited is a commercial bank in Nepal. The bank is an ‘A’ class commercial bank licensed by Nepal Rastra Bank and has branches all across the nation with its head office in Kathmandu which provides entire commercial banking services.

The bank's shares are publicly traded as an 'A' category company in the Nepal Stock Exchange. It is one of the highest-earning banks in Nepal and is one of the banks having the highest number of shareholders.

Correspondent Network
The bank has been maintaining harmonious correspondent relationships with various international banks from various countries to facilitate trade, remittance, and other cross border services. Through these correspondents, the bank is able to provide services in any major currencies in the world.

Network
Prabhu bank limited is merged with Century Bank in January 2023. Prabhu bank limited acquired Kist bank and others 2 banks (Prabhu Bikash Bank) in 2016 and 2015 respectively.

External links
 Official Website of Prabhu Bank Limited

See also

 list of banks in Nepal
 Commercial Banks of Nepal

References

Banks of Nepal
Banks with year of establishment missing